The 2007 Island Games on the island of Rhodes was the 4th edition in which a women's football (soccer) tournament was played at the multi-games competition. It was contested by 11 teams.

Åland won the tournament for the first time.

Participants

 Prince Edward Island

Group Phase

Group A

Group B

Group C

Group D

Placement play-off & knock-out matches

9th – 11th place semi-final

5th – 8th place semi-finals

9th place match

7th place match

5th place match

Final stage

Semi-finals

3rd place match

Final

Final rankings

See also
 Men's Football at the 2007 Island Games

External links
Official 2007 website

2007
Women
Island